Legitimacy, from the Latin legitimare meaning "to make lawful", may refer to:
 Legitimacy (criminal law)
 Legitimacy (family law)
 Legitimacy (political)

See also 
 Bastard (law of England and Wales)
 Illegitimacy in fiction
 Legit (disambiguation)
 Legitimate (professional wrestling)
 Legitimate expectation
 Legitimate peripheral participation
 Legitimate theater
 Legitimation
 Legitime
 Legitimists (disambiguation)
 Nomen illegitimum in botany is a valid published name that contravenes the international articles
 Sources of law